Memos Mpegnis (born in 1974 on Salamis Island) is a Greek actor. He plays in Hellenic television series and theatre. He also plays the piano relatively fluently and sings. He has had leading roles in many television series such as Akros Oikogeniakon (2001–2003), Mi mou les antio (2004–2005), Ston Ilio tou Aigaiou (2005–2006) on the ANT1 channel. He currently stars in the MEGA TV Cyprus' show ΤΟ ΔΑΧΤΥΛΙΔΙ ΤΗΣ ΦΩΤΙΑΣ (The Ring of Fire 2014-2015).

His career as an actor began quite by accident when he played piano in a performance of Katia Dandoulaki, which prompted him to enter into acting. He has studied the piano since he was 5 years old and has graduated as a soloist and his career was going to be as a pianist until Katia Dandoulaki met him and asked him to portray a soldier alongside fellow actors Giorgos Karamihos and Panagiotis Petrakis in a play called "The Trojan Women" written by Euripides.

Filmography

Television

Film

References

Greek male actors
21st-century Greek male actors
1974 births
Living people
People from Salamis Island